Old El Paso is a brand of Tex-Mex-style foods from American food producer General Mills. These include dinner kits, tacos and tortillas, taco seasoning, sauces, condiments, rice, and refried beans. 

Old El Paso products are marketed across the globe. The brand is owned by General Mills. Pillsbury acquired it in 1995, when its then-parent company Grand Metropolitan bought Pet, Inc., which had itself taken over the brand in 1968 from the Mountain Pass Canning Company.

The name is a reference to the city of El Paso, Texas, and the historical "Old" period when Texas was a part of Mexico.

History and products
In 1917, the Mountain Pass Canning Company in New Mexico was bought from a local in El Paso, Texas. The Old El Paso company originally started by selling canned tomatoes and pinto beans. By 1938, Old El Paso was registered as a trade mark. 

Old El Paso relocated to many locations around the U.S., before finally settling in Texas in 1958. In 1969, Old El Paso became the first national brand to offer a full line of Mexican meals in supermarkets and the first to advertise Mexican cuisine in the U.S. 

In 1970, American supermarkets created a Mexican food section in their stores for the first time, due to the influence of Old El Paso and other Mexican food products. Also in the '70s, Old El Paso introduced a taco dinner globally, where many international markets were unfamiliar with Mexican cuisine. 

In 2010, Old El Paso released products under the “Smart Fiesta” line, also known as “Healthy Fiesta” in some regions. This line features healthier alternatives for their traditional dinner kits. The Smart Fiesta dinner kits include hard and soft taco shells and tortillas made with whole grain, and fajita and taco seasoning with reduced sodium.  

In 2013, Old El Paso introduced their new frozen entrees line, only available in the US. The product line features frozen ready-made burritos, quesadillas, enchiladas, and fajitas. The entrees are available in chicken, ground beef, or steak. There are no vegan or vegetarian options currently. 

In 2019, Old El Paso introduced a new shredded cheese line in partnership with Crystal Farms Dairy Company. 

Today, Old El Paso is sold in the United States, Canada, the UK, Germany, Australia, Ireland, France, Italy, Spain, Portugal, Switzerland, Sweden, Norway, and Finland, among other countries.

References

External links
Old El Paso USA
Old El Paso UK
Old El Paso Germany
Old El Paso Spain
Old El Paso Finland
Old El Paso Sweden
Old El Paso Australia
Old El Paso Canada 
Old El Paso France
Old El Paso Norway
Official Old El Paso UK Facebook Page
General Mills brands
Tex-Mex cuisine
Products introduced in 1938